Pulkkila is a former municipality and a village located in Northern Finland. Pulkkila is the administrative center of the municipality of Siikalatva and belongs to the region of Northern Ostrobothnia.

Pulkkila has 792 inhabitants and the village is unilingually Finnish.

Pulkkila is best known for its metal industry and the artificial lake of Uljua.

Pulkkila was an independent municipality until it was consolidated with Kestilä, Piippola and Rantsila on 1 January 2009 to form a new municipality of Siikalatva.

Notable persons from Pulkkila
 Pentti Haanpää, writer
 T. I. Itkonen
 Ilmari Kianto, writer

References

External links 

 Municipality of Pulkkila – official site 

Former municipalities of Finland
Populated places established in 1867
Populated places disestablished in 2009
2009 disestablishments in Finland
Siikalatva